Mathias Ross Jensen (born 15 January 2001) is a Danish professional footballer who plays as a central defender for Turkish Süper Lig club Galatasaray. He is the older brother of Oliver Ross.

Club career

AaB Fodbold
Growing up in the Hasseris district of Aalborg, Ross started his football career as a 10-year-old at Aalborg KFUM. At under-13 level he joined the AaB youth academy. In his first year as a U17 player, other centre backs were preferred ahead of Ross, which meant that he mainly appeared on the reserve team or as a substitute striker in the final minutes. In his second U17 year, however, he became a regular player for the team in the U17 league. AaB U17 finished the 2017–18 season in third place in the league table, and in June 2018 he was named U17 Player of the Year in AaB.

Ross made his professional debut for the AaB first team on 2 September 2018, when he came on as a substitute after 27 minutes instead of an injured Jakob Blåbjerg in a 2–2 draw against Randers FC. At the time of the substitution, AaB were behind 2–1, and newspaper Tipsbladet described Ross' debut as "excellent". A month later, in October 2018, he was permanently promoted to AaB's first team squad. During the regular season he was utilised a total of three times, but from the relegation round he established himself as a starter in the first team. AaB eventually qualified for the play-offs to participate in the first qualifying round for the UEFA Europa League, where they were, however, eliminated in the first round against AGF.

In January 2019, Ross signed a contract extension keeping him in AaB until 2023.

Galatasaray
On 8 September 2022, he signed a 4-year contract with Galatasaray. It has been announced that a transfer fee of €1,750,000 will be paid to the player's former team, AaB.

International career
Ross made his international debut on 7 October 2017 as part of the Denmark under-17 team, when he was part of the starting lineup and played 90 minutes in a 3–4 defeat to Germany in a friendly match. He went from being a peripheral player under the auspices of the Danish Football Association (DBU) to being team captain in the last match during the 2017 UEFA European Under-17 Championship. He made a total of 11 appearances for the national under-17 team.

Ross made his first appearance for the Denmark under-19 team on 7 September 2018, and soon established himself as a starter.

References

External links
 

2001 births
Living people
Danish men's footballers
Denmark youth international footballers
Denmark under-21 international footballers
Danish Superliga players
Süper Lig players
AaB Fodbold players
Galatasaray S.K. footballers
Danish expatriate men's footballers
Expatriate footballers in Turkey
Association football defenders
Sportspeople from Aalborg